Publius Aelius Hadrianus Marullinus (c. 31 – c. 91 AD), also known as Aelius Hadrianus Marullinus or Aelius Marullinus was a Roman Senator of Praetorian rank from Hispania who lived in the Roman Empire during the 1st century.

Family 
Marullinus came from a well-established, wealthy and aristocratic family of Praetorian rank in the gens Aelia. His mother is unknown and his father was a Roman senator called Publius Aelius Hadrianus Marullinus, also the name of his paternal grandfather and paternal great-grandfather. 

The paternal ancestors of Marullinus had descended from Picenum (modern Marche and Abruzzo, Italy). They were originally centurions who participated in the Punic Wars possibly under the general Scipio Africanus. About 205 BC, at the end of the Second Punic War, the paternal ancestors of Marullinus left Picenum and settled in Italica (near modern Seville, Spain) in the Roman Province of Hispania Baetica.

The paternal great-grandfather of Marullinus, Publius Aelius Hadrianus Marullinus, was admitted into the Roman Senate by Octavian (future Emperor Augustus) when he served as a member of the Second Triumvirate between 43 BC and 33 BC. He was the first person in his family to become a senator, however the circumstances leading him to be admitted into the senate are unknown. Nevertheless, Marullinus was one of the few Romans that came from the provinces who Octavian had ever admitted into the Senate.

History 
Marullinus was born and raised in Italica, but spent various amounts of time in Rome. He married a noblewoman from Italica called Ulpia, who was a sister of the Roman general and senator Marcus Ulpius Traianus, the father of Emperor Trajan.

Ulpia and Marullinus had at least one child, a son called Publius Aelius Hadrianus Afer, who later was a soldier and politician. Hadrianus Afer married Domitia Paulina and had two children: Aelia Domitia Paulina (75–130) and Publius Aelius Hadrianus (76–138). Hadrianus was adopted by Trajan as his heir and eventually succeeded him as Emperor Hadrian.

Marullinus had a reputation in practising astrology and had predicted that his grandson would rule as Roman Emperor.

When Hadrian ruled as Roman Emperor, as a tribute to his birthplace and ancestry, he established Hispania Baetica as a province. Hadrian's second adoptive son and successor Antoninus Pius, assumed the name Aelius Hadrianus as a part of his name when he ruled as Emperor. The sixth child born to Roman Emperor Marcus Aurelius and Roman Empress Faustina the Younger was named Hadrianus.  Hadrianus (152–157) was named in honour of his grandfather Hadrian.

Sources
 Historia Augusta – Life of Hadrian
 Tiberius the Politician – Ed2, By Barbara Levick, Levick B Staff
 Marcus Aurelius By Anthony Richard Birley
 The provincial at Rome, By Ronald Syme, Anthony Birley
Rome and the Balkans 80 BC – AD 14 By Ronald Syme, Anthony Birley

1st-century Romans
Senators of the Roman Empire
Hadrianus Marullinus, Publius
Picenum
30s births
90s deaths
Year of birth uncertain
Year of death uncertain